Yevgeni Franzevich Bauer (1865 – ) was a Russian film director of silent films, a theatre artist and a screenwriter. His work had a great influence on the aesthetics of Russian cinematography at the beginning of the 20th century.

Bauer made more than seventy films between 1913 and 1917 of which 26 survived. He already used the relatively long sequence shots and displacements that would come to be associated with camera virtuosos. Los Angeles Times film critic Kenneth Turan called Bauer "The greatest director you've never heard of." Georges Sadoul called him "the first true artist in the history of cinema".

Biography
Bauer was born in Moscow in 1865, the son of the Bohemian immigrant musician Franz Bauer and his wife, an operatic singer. From childhood, Bauer displayed artistic tendencies and participated in his favourite dramatised scenes (his sister was a professional actress).

In 1887, Bauer graduated from the Moscow School of Painting, Sculpture and Architecture. He tried out a number of different professions, first working as a caricaturist, drawing satirical sketches for the press. He then became a master of art photography, before moving to work in the theatre, as a producer, an impresario, and a professional set designer. In the 1890s he married the actress and dancer Lina Ancharovna, whose surname he used during the First World War when he went under the pseudonym of Evgeni Ancharov, feeling that his own surname was "too German".

Even in these early years, Bauer was attracted to cinematography and started to work as an artistic producer and director. His first work in the cinema was an order for set decorations for the film "300 Years of the House of Romanov" (1913), produced by Alexander Drankov's film company. After this, Bauer worked for Drankov as a producer and made four films.  He then made another four films for the Moscow branch of the French company Pathé Brothers, and then finally started to work for the Khanzhonkov company, which at that time was the unspoken leader in Russian cinematography.

From the end of 1913 to the start of 1917, Bauer made more than 80 films, of which less than half have survived. Bauer worked mainly in the genres of social and psychological drama (although he also made comedies), such as Daydreams, After Death (both 1915), A Life for a Life (1916), and The Revolutionary (1917). He worked with the leading actors of Russian silent cinema, including Ivan Mozzhukhin, Vera Kholodnaya, Vitold Polonsky, Ivan Perestiani, Vera Karalli and others.

In 1917, Bauer and the Khanzhonkov company moved to a new studio in Yalta, where he made the film For Happiness with the young actor Lev Kuleshov. Bauer broke his leg on the set and had to work on his next film, The King of Paris, from a bathchair. However, Bauer started to suffer from complications relating to pneumonia and could not complete this film. On 22 June 1917, Bauer died in a Yalta hospital. His final film was completed by actress Olga Rakhmanova.

Significance and influence
Bauer is considered a leading stylist of Russian silent cinematography and placed particular emphasis on the pictorial aspect of film-making. He is considered a master of psychological drama, and also one of the first Russian directors who developed the artistic side of cinema including montage, mise-en-scene and the composition of the frame. He made great use of his theatrical experience when making his films, the outcomes of which occasionally prefigured future achievements in cinema. Bauer was the first to start to consider the placing of lights on the film-set and changed the lighting during the filming, used unusual filming angles, made frequent use of wide spaces, and filmed through "gaseous" material to produce the effect of fog. He attributed great significance to the composition of each shot,  constructing decor and natural shots with artistic expressions of classical landscapes, made use of camera movement to widen the space of the shot, and add a dramatic effect. Bauer's artistic experiments and outstanding expertise gave him a reputation as the leading director in Russian cinema.

Selected filmography
 1913 - Uncle's Apartment (with Pyotr Chardynin)
 1913 - Twilight of a Woman's Soul
 1914 - The Post Troika Races Along
 1914 - The Free Bird
 1914 - The Girl from the Street
 1914 - Her Heroic Feat
 1914 - Life and Death
 1914 - Silent Witnesses
 1914 - Glory to Us, Death to the Enemy
 1914 - Tears
 1915 - Daydreams
 1915 - The 1002nd Ruse
 1915 - Children of the Age
 1915 - Heavenly Wings
 1915 - Song of Triumphant Love
 1915 - The Vanquisher of Women's Hearts
 1915 - After Death
 1915 - The Happiness of Eternal Night
 1915 - The Thousand and Second Cunning
 1916 - The Old Wrestler's Grief
 1916 - A Life for a Life
 1916 - The Queen of the Screen
 1917 - Alarm
 1917 - The Revolutionary
 1917 - The Dying Swan
 1917 - For Happiness
 1917 - The King of Paris

References

External links

Short biography
 
 http://www.davidbordwell.net/blog/category/directors-bauer/
 http://periodika.digitale-sammlungen.de/wsa/Blatt_bsb00051019,00247.html by N. Drubek-Meyer, "Der Film als Leben nach dem Tode (Evgenij Bauėrs Posle smerti, 1915)." Wiener Slawistischer Almanach 60, 2007, pp 457–273.

Silent film directors
Russian film directors
Male screenwriters
Russian male writers
Russian caricaturists
Russian editorial cartoonists
Russian satirists
1865 births
1917 deaths
People from the Russian Empire of Czech descent
Articles containing video clips
20th-century Russian screenwriters
20th-century Russian male writers
Deaths from pneumonia in Ukraine
Moscow School of Painting, Sculpture and Architecture alumni